Zabawka is a 1933 Polish romantic drama film directed by Michał Waszyński.

Cast
Alma Kar ...  Janeczka, stage-named Lulu
Stefan Gulanicki (under the pseudonym Stefan Gucki)...  Baron Łatoszyński 
Eugeniusz Bodo...  Kuźma, the forester's son
Jerzy Marr ...  Jurek Łatoszyński, the Baron's son
Wiktor Biegański ...  Szczepan Mylicki, the Baron's friend
Helena Zarembina ...  Weronika, the Baron's housekeeper
Julian Krzewiński ...  The Baron's Majordomo
Stanisław Sielański...  Dr. Wessel, houseguest
Zofia Ślaska ...  Hanka, Jurek's fiancee
Wanda Jarszewska ...  Hanka's Mother
Konrad Tom ...  The Cabaret Owner
Zula Pogorzelska ...  Zuzia, a showgirl
Stefania Górska ...  Mela, a showgirl

References

External links 
 

1933 films
1930s Polish-language films
Polish black-and-white films
Films directed by Michał Waszyński
1933 romantic drama films
Polish romantic drama films